Héctor Ernesto Juan Giorgetti (18 January 1956 – 8 September 2020) was an Argentine footballer who played for clubs of Argentina, Chile and Colombia.

Giorgetti was born in General San Martín (Buenos Aires), Argentina. Called the "Mono" or "Loco", he emerged in Chacarita Juniors, followed by Deportes Tolima of Colombia. He returned to Argentina playing in Estudiantes de Buenos Aires, All Boys, Sportivo Italiano and Huracán. In this last he played in first and promotion.

In 1988 he arrived at Universidad de Chile, descending with the team to second division. The following year he played for Palestino and ended his football career in Sportivo Italiano.

Teams
  Chacarita Juniors 1975–1977
  Deportes Tolima 1977–1978
  Chacarita Juniors 1978
  Sportivo Italiano 1979
  Estudiantes de Buenos Aires 1980–1984
  All Boys 1985–1986
  Huracán 1987–1988
  Universidad de Chile 1988
  Palestino 1989–1990
  Sportivo Italiano 1991–1993

References
 

http://www.globopedia.com.ar/2012/03/hector-giorgetti-el-mono.html

1956 births
2020 deaths
Argentine footballers
Argentine expatriate footballers
Estudiantes de Buenos Aires footballers
Chacarita Juniors footballers
Sportivo Italiano footballers
Club Atlético Huracán footballers
All Boys footballers
Club Deportivo Palestino footballers
Universidad de Chile footballers
Deportes Tolima footballers
Chilean Primera División players
Argentine Primera División players
Categoría Primera A players
Expatriate footballers in Chile
Expatriate footballers in Colombia
Association footballers not categorized by position
Footballers from Buenos Aires